Kalinyamatan is a subdistrict in Jepara Regency, Province Central Java, Indonesia.

External links
 Jepara Government

References

Districts of Central Java